Jail Ward is a ward located under Nagaland's capital city, Kohima. The ward falls under the designated Ward No. 19 of the Kohima Municipal Council.

See also
 Municipal Wards of Kohima

References

External links
 Map of Kohima Ward No. 19

Kohima
Wards of Kohima